The 2020 DFB-Pokal Final decided the winner of the 2019–20 DFB-Pokal, the 77th season of the annual German football cup competition. The match was played on 4 July 2020 at the Olympiastadion in Berlin. Though originally scheduled for 23 May 2020, the German Football Association postponed the final on 24 April due to the COVID-19 pandemic in Germany. On 11 May 2020, the DFB Executive Committee approved a resumption of the competition, with the final scheduled for 4 July, subject to political approval, using a hygiene concept similar to that implemented by the DFL in the Bundesliga and 2. Bundesliga. As with other competitions, the match was played behind closed doors without any spectators. Due to the postponement, the match was the first DFB-Pokal final to take place after June since 1974.

The match featured Bundesliga clubs Bayer Leverkusen, in their first final since 2009, and Bayern Munich, the title holders and record-winners of the competition in their third consecutive final. Bayern Munich won the final 4–2 to win a second consecutive and record 20th overall DFB-Pokal title.

With the win, Bayern completed their 13th domestic double (later completing a second continental treble), and played at home against 2019–20 Bundesliga runners-up Borussia Dortmund in the 2020 DFL-Supercup. Because Bayern had already qualified for the Champions League through the Bundesliga, the sixth-place team in the Bundesliga, 1899 Hoffenheim, earned qualification for the group stage of the 2020–21 edition of the UEFA Europa League, and the league's second qualifying round spot went to the team in seventh, VfL Wolfsburg.

Teams
In the following table, finals until 1943 were in the Tschammerpokal era, since 1953 were in the DFB-Pokal era.

Background

Route to the final
The DFB-Pokal began with 64 teams in a single-elimination knockout cup competition. There were a total of five rounds leading up to the final. Teams were drawn against each other, and the winner after 90 minutes would advance. If still tied, 30 minutes of extra time was played. If the score was still level, a penalty shoot-out was used to determine the winner.

Note: In all results below, the score of the finalist is given first (H: home; A: away).

Match

Details

Statistics

See also
2020 DFL-Supercup
Football in Berlin

Notes

References

External links
 
 Match report at kicker.de 
 Match report at WorldFootball.net
 Match report at Fussballdaten.de 

2020
2019–20 in German football cups
Bayer 04 Leverkusen matches
FC Bayern Munich matches
Football competitions in Berlin
July 2020 sports events in Germany
2020 in Berlin
Association football events postponed due to the COVID-19 pandemic